Parker is an unincorporated community in Ashe County, North Carolina, United States, on North Carolina Highway 88. It lies at an elevation of 3,136 feet (956 m).

References

Unincorporated communities in Ashe County, North Carolina
Unincorporated communities in North Carolina